Jeffery & Cole Casserole is an American sketch comedy program that aired on Logo in 2009 and 2010. The show is written, directed and edited by real-life comedy duo Jeffery Self and Cole Escola. The series debuted on Logo June 19, 2009, and was renewed for a second season, which premiered July 9, 2010, also on Logo. The show was canceled March 17, 2011.

Origins
The program originated from the internet popularity of New York-based comedy duo Jeffery Self and Cole Escola, previously known for their comedic viral videos under the YouTube moniker VGL (Very Good Looking) Gay Boys. Self and Escola have said that they were approached via Facebook by executives from Logo, who offered them a development deal after following their videos and attending one of their live shows.

Format
Casserole was recorded entirely with a webcam and follows a format similar to Self and Escola's previous internet video skits. Each episode begins with Self and Escola performing an introductory skit, in which they sit in front of a webcam and welcome the audience to the show. The show then features one major plotline that is dispersed between other short, unrelated comedy segments. Many of the show's plotlines revolve around an all-girls Catholic school in which both Self and Escola portray themselves as students. The unrelated comedy segments tend to skew absurdist. The show's plotlines and its short segments are camp in nature.

The series features cameo appearances by artists from New York City's downtown performance art scene, including Bridget Everett, Erin Markey, and Max Steele, who plays Jeffery and Cole's classmate, Becky. Famous queer singer and performer Justin Bond appears in several episodes, playing the school's principal, Agnes. Pandora Boxx, a Rochester, New York drag queen made famous by the reality show "RuPaul's Drag Race," has appeared once as well as British actor Christian Coulson.

Episodes

Season 1 (2009)

Season 2 (2010)

References

External links
 Jeffery and Cole Casserole official site
 
 Jeffery Self's Blog
 Cole Escola's Blog
 Jeffery and Cole interviewed by Max Steele

2000s American sketch comedy television series
2010s American sketch comedy television series
2009 American television series debuts
2010 American television series endings
Logo TV original programming
2000s American LGBT-related comedy television series
2010s American LGBT-related comedy television series